Alexandra Bridge is the name of a locality, and bridges over the Blackwood River in the South West of Western Australia.

The locality had a range of groups of people from the area involved in sports clubs, usually from communities very close such as Witchcliffe. 

The first bridge was built in 1897 and destroyed in a 1982 flood.

It has camping facilities, and is similar to other bridge locations on the river like Sues Bridge, which is in the Blackwood River National Park.

Notes

Blackwood River
Bridges in Western Australia